Puppet Master (Philip Masters) is a supervillain appearing in American comic books published by Marvel Comics.

The Puppet Master uses radioactive clay to make puppets in the likenesses of real people, whom he can then control by attaching the clay puppets to strings and moving them about. Presumably he has some sort of psionic ability that enables him to do this. He has a deep hatred of the Thing, who is romantically interested in his stepdaughter, Alicia Masters. He once tried to take over the world but was thwarted in this effort by the Fantastic Four.

Publication history

The Puppet Master's first appearance was in Fantastic Four #8 (November 1962), and he was created by Stan Lee and Jack Kirby. His last name, Masters, was revealed in the letters page of Fantastic Four #42 (Sept. 1965), as suggested by a reader, who was given a No-Prize for her service to Marvel. The Puppet Master's origin is told in Marvel Team-Up #6 (January 1973).

Fictional character biography
Philip Masters, the man who becomes the Puppet Master, was born in Dragorin, a town in the small fictional Balkan nation of Transia. He moved to the United States at the age of eight. Growing up he was socially maladjusted and had no friends. (According to Spider-Man Family #4, his mother died when he was young and he was often picked on, which caused him to turn to his puppets for "friendship".)

After he finished college he went into business with Jacob Reiss. Philip was jealous of Reiss' wealth and of his family and decided to sabotage his workplace, but Reiss caught him in the act. The two of them break into a fight which results in an explosion that kills Reiss and blinds his daughter Alicia, who was also caught in the blast.

Phillip plays the explosion off as an accident, and then starts a relationship Reiss' wife, Marcia. He marries Marcia and adopts Alicia. Later, Marcia dies and it is more than he can bear and he loses his sanity. He begins experimenting with the radioactive clay puppets that he uses to control specific individuals' bodies. When the Human Torch interferes with one of his experiments, he sets about bringing down the Fantastic Four. He captures the Invisible Girl and the Thing, and masterminds a mass jailbreak using the warden's trustee. He then falls through a window to his death after tripping over Alicia's hand. 

Though his fatal fall is alluded to in his subsequent appearance, it is never explained how he is still alive. He has himself committed to a sanitorium for several months in the belief that this will allow the world to forget him. Upon release he takes control of Namor and uses him to battle the Fantastic Four. He also pits the Human Torch and the Thing against each other. He teams up with the Mad Thinker and uses the original X-Men to battle the Fantastic Four. Teaming up again with the Thinker, who would become his frequent ally, he battles the Thing and the Torch again, using animated life-size mannequins to battle the pair.

The Puppet Master is later seen among a group of criminals assembled by Doctor Doom. He then controls Namor again. He opposes the original X-Men through the mind-controlled Mimic. He also sparks a battle between the Hulk and Namor by controlling the Hulk.

The Puppet Master next allies with the Mad Thinker and Egghead in their attempt to blackmail the U.S. He forces Iron Man to battle Captain Marvel. He again teams with the Thinker, and attacks the Fantastic Four using androids of their past foes. He controls Ballox the Monstroid, and battles Spider-Man and the Vision. With the Thinker, he battles Spider-Man and the Thing. He then forces Thor to battle the Fantastic Four. He then controls the Wrecker and Power Man. Eventually, the Puppet Master returns to his homeland, where he encounters Modred the Mystic.

With Doctor Doom, the Puppet Master traps the Fantastic Four within the miniature artificial city of "Liddleville", their minds trapped inside tiny cybernetic, part-organic copies of their original bodies. However, Doom perverts what had been intended by the Puppet Master as a chance to give Alicia and Ben a normal life into a trap, and he eventually helps the Fantastic Four learn the truth and escape Liddleville while trapping Doom in the android body he had used to monitor the Fantastic Four. He is defeated by Doom in Liddleville  and seemed to have been destroyed, but his mind is then resurrected in a body of living radioactive clay. He battles the Thing on the mental plane, and his physical clay body is destroyed. He is eventually resurrected in his original body by the Sphinx.

He was once thought to have been killed when he fell out of the window of a fairly tall building, but miraculously survived. The Puppet Master has exhibited an uncanny ability to cheat death, dodging mortal threats that have included bomb blasts, drownings, and even a giant squid attack. Liddleville would later be used against the Micronauts and X-Force.

The jealous Puppet Master often uses his clay to manipulate the lives of the Fantastic Four, especially where his stepdaughter was concerned. He is particularly concerned with guarding his precious Alicia from marrying the likes of the Thing. But he is later just as outraged when she is engaged to Johnny Storm, also a member of the Fantastic Four.

With the Thinker and the Wizard, Masters attempts to disrupt the wedding of the Human Torch and Alicia. The plan was to launch an attack on the church after the wedding ceremony, but when he sees how happy Alicia is to marry Johnny, Masters is overcome with remorse and turns on his associates, launching the Dragon Man against them: his wedding gift to Alicia and Johnny.

Later, Masters is reformed, remarried, and has a stepson; the toys he crafts for his son inadvertently caused a battle between Power Pack and the alien Ciegramites. He reveals to the Thing that he had discovered that the Alicia Johnny had married was actually a Skrull.

The Puppet Master has been shown on two occasions attempting to leave his (overtly) criminal life behind. In the first, he found some measure of spiritual enlightenment in the service of the billionaire philosopher/cultist Satori. Satori employs Masters to construct a "perfect man" from his clay, which would then receive life and the power cosmic from the Silver Surfer and absorb Satori's mind, so that he might survive his body's death and serve as a proper leader to his flock. Masters at some point left this cult, and entered a S.H.I.E.L.D.-maintained witness protection program, using his abilities to aid the government through the dulling of memories of other so-protected criminals' previous associates. Masters reached out through his powers to control Ben Grimm and Alicia, duping Ben into a "married life" with his despondent daughter, whom Ben had stopped seeing years before. Ben was freed, but the Fantastic Four were prevented from taking any measure of revenge upon Masters, given his S.H.I.E.L.D. affiliation.

The Puppet Master returned to criminal life and affiliated himself with the Mad Thinker. Utilizing a device constructed by Mad Thinker, he was able to control a large number of non-super-humans, most notably members of the Yancy Street Gang to escalate a battle between the two different factions in the superhero Civil War.

In that same issue he reveals that he always planned to kill the person he was working with in past team-ups and that he has anger management problems. Mad Thinker gives him the number of a good therapist. This exchange seems to contradict previous interactions between the two.

The Puppet Master is then in the business of selling slaves (primarily females). Some of those under his control are superhuman females captured by members of the Chilean Army, and among those held captive are Dusk, Tigra, Silverclaw, Stature, and Araña. The Puppet Master also has random male slaves fight to the death. Once again the Puppet Master is presumed dead when he detonates explosives hidden beneath the house he used as a base, in a battle against Ms. Marvel.

During the Fear Itself storyline, Puppet Master is seen in a comatose state in the Raft's infirmary. It is revealed that Purple Man was the one who had Puppet Master manipulate Misty Knight's Heroes for Hire organization to establish a criminal organization for him while he was in jail. Before he could kill Puppet Master, Elektra and Shroud arrive and prevented Purple Man from killing Puppet Master. Purple Man spared Puppet Master and took control of some inmates to attack Elektra and Shroud before escaping from the Raft.

Puppet Master later appears by Misty Knight's side where he uses the villains on Misty Knight's side as payback on Purple Man.

Later, the Puppet Master has been murdered, with all evidence pointing to the Thing as the person responsible. The crime took place in a sealed room that even Mister Fantastic could barely enter with Alicia as the only witness, and even she cannot decipher what has happened. Although the Thing claims innocence, he allows himself to be locked up. As it turns out, the dead Puppet Master was a decoy and the real Puppet Master had been hidden away by the Quiet Man, the mastermind behind Thing's framing and other misfortunes the Fantastic Four had suffered. Mister Fantastic later finds the real Puppet Master captive in the Quiet Man's building.

Powers and abilities
The Puppet Master have no true superpowers, but he does possess a very gifted mind, as well as doctorate in biology. He has extensive knowledge of craftsmanship and experimental science. His greatest strength was the skill to create lifelike marionette puppets with extreme speed after Masters molded on those real people. Through intense concentration, Masters is able to control the physical actions of anyone whom that he sculpts from. For how he did this had never adequately explained other than using some type of special neurokinetic clay. The clay he mixed within this solution can be mystical, slightly radioactive, and found in a remote area near Wundagore Mountain (Transia), site to the prison of an elder god Chthon. He cannot control the actions of essentially mindless creatures or supremely strong-willed beings. His manipulative skills are limited to one person at a time, even by far distance. While in his clay form, he possesses its unique features. Masters could split himself into 1/10 smaller replicas, each with a psychic link and shape-changing capabilities. Unfortunately, these abilities were lost, thanks to the Sphinx.

In other media

Television
 The Puppet Master appeared in the 1982 Incredible Hulk episode "Bruce Banner: Unmasked", voiced by Bob Holt. He gets control of the residents in Mesa City while also attempting to control the Hulk - his Hulk 'doll' even allows him to exert some slight influence over Bruce Banner, although Banner simply feels uncomfortable rather than falling under the Puppet Master's control - simultaneously causing the Hulk's true identity to be revealed, although even when the Hulk is in his natural state his sheer strength of will allowed him to eventually throw off Puppet-Master's influence. The only person he doesn't make a puppet of is his stepdaughter Alicia, which allows Bruce and Rick to track him down, Rick subsequently using the Puppet Master's equipment to erase all memory of the Hulk's true identity prior to its destruction.
 The Puppet Master appeared in the two-part Fantastic Four episode "Origin of the Fantastic Four", voiced by Neil Ross. Unlike the comic version, this Puppet Master despised Alicia, treating her as a burden and a pawn to be used against the Fantastic Four. He took control of the Thing and used him to capture Invisible Woman. Mister Fantastic freed the Thing from his control and defeated the Puppet Master. Upon returning to his apartment to reclaim his final doll, Puppet Master ended up in a fight with Alicia and then he apparently fell to his death from the apartment window. The Fantastic Four weren't able to find his body and claimed that he "vanished from Earth".
 The Puppet Master appears in Fantastic Four: World's Greatest Heroes TV series, voiced by Alvin Sanders. As is the case with Alicia, the Puppet Master is African-American in this series. Debuting in the episode "Puppet Master," he was a sculptor whose clay was hit from a fragment of the same space station where the Fantastic Four were in when they got their powers. After touching his clay, he discovered he can manipulate the person of whoever he sculpts, resulting in him taking over the Thing and kidnapping the award-winning artists and Alicia. When the other Fantastic Four members arrived, the Puppet Master sculpted the Human Torch and took control of him until Alicia broke the sculptures and the Puppet Master is jailed. However, the ending hints at him escaping as he disguised some clay as a pair of sunglasses. In the episode "Strings", Puppet Master had manipulated his guards into bringing him enough of his clay to control all of the city officials like the mayor and the police chief. This allowed him to have the Fantastic Four evicted from the Baxter Building and turned into wanted criminals. Puppet Master's ultimate goal was to have Mister Fantastic enhance his powers, but he was foiled. In the final scene while locked up in the Vault, he removes some clay from under his false teeth only for Invisible Woman to appear and take it from him.

Film
 In the extended edition of the Fantastic Four DVD, the Thing notices puppets in a scene with Alicia Masters at her art gallery. She says that they belong to her father.

Video game
 The Puppet Master appeared in the 2005 Fantastic Four video game, voiced by James C. Mathis III. Although the Fantastic Four doesn't fight him directly, he sends several exhibits at a museum (ex. mummies and dinosaurs) after the Fantastic Four when they protect Alicia. In the end after the heroes destroyed the statue of Horus, he escapes to the back door. Puppet Master's last line is "Next time, Fantastic Fools, the Puppet Master will not fail." The heroes aren't aware that he was responsible for the disaster, believing it instead to be a side-effect of the cosmic rays that gave them their powers. In the instruction booklet that comes with the game, Puppet Master's bio is given explaining that he uses radioactive clay to control whoever he chooses. This is probably how he made the exhibits in the museum come to life and attack the Fantastic Four.

Reception
In August 2009, TIME listed the Puppet Master as one of the "Top 10 Oddest Marvel Characters".

References

External links
 Puppet Master at Marvel.com

Characters created by Jack Kirby
Characters created by Stan Lee
Comics characters introduced in 1962
Fictional amorphous creatures
Fictional artists
Fictional biologists
Fictional characters who can duplicate themselves
Fictional puppeteers
Fictional sculptors
Fictional toymakers and toy inventors
Marvel Comics characters who are shapeshifters
Marvel Comics scientists
Marvel Comics supervillains
Transians